indecs (an acronym of "interoperability of data in e-commerce systems"; written in lower case) was a project partly funded by the European Community Info 2000 initiative and by several organisations representing the music, rights, text publishing, authors, library and other sectors in 1998-2000, which has since been used in a number of metadata activities. A final report and related documents were published; the indecs Metadata Framework document is a concise summary.

indecs provided an analysis of the requirements for metadata for e-commerce of content (intellectual property) in the network environment, focusing on semantic interoperability. Semantic interoperability deals with the question of how one computer system knows what the terms from another computer system mean (e.g. if A says "owner" and B says "owner", are they referring to the same thing? If A says "released" and B says "disseminated", do they mean different things?).

indecs was built from a simple generic model of commerce (the "model of making"): a model of the life cycle of any kind of content from conception to the final physical or digital copies. The top-level model is summarised as "people make stuff; people use stuff; and (for commerce to take place) people make deals about the stuff". If secure machine-to-machine management of commerce is to be possible, the stuff, the people and the deals must all be securely identified and described in standardised ways that machines can interpret and use. Central to the analysis is the assumption that it is possible to produce a generic mechanism to handle complex metadata for all different types of content. So, for example, instead of treating sound carriers, books, videos and photographs as fundamentally different things with different (if similar) characteristics, they are all recognised as creations with different values of the same higher-level attributes, whose metadata can be supported in a common environment.

Framework

The indecs analysis supports interoperability of at least five different types:

 Across media (such as books, serials, audio, audiovisual, software, abstract works, visual material).
 Across functions (such as cataloging, discovery, workflow and rights management).
 Across levels of metadata (from simple to complex).
 Across semantic barriers. 
 Across linguistic barriers.

The indecs project developed a framework, described in detail in the final project documents, within which such interoperability could be achieved. indecs proposed four principles as key to the management of identification:

 The principle of Unique Identification: every entity should be uniquely identified within an identified namespace.
 The principle of Functional Granularity: it should be possible to identify an entity whenever it needs to be distinguished
 The principle of Designated Authority: the author of an item of metadata should be securely identified.
 The principle of Appropriate Access: everyone requires access to the metadata on which they depend, and privacy and confidentiality for their own metadata from those who are not dependent on it.

indecs also produced a definition of metadata:
 An item of metadata is a relationship that someone claims to exist between two referents (entities).

The indecs framework stresses the significance of relationships, which lie at the heart of the indecs analysis. It underlines the importance of unique identification of all entities (since otherwise expressing relationships between them is of little practical utility). Finally, it raises the question of authority: the identification of the person making the claim is as significant as the identification of any other entity.

(Note: describing metadata as linking two referents may seem unusual: the point is that an unambiguous piece of metadata has to relate to precise enough things - referents - at each end of the link (e.g. my CAR is GREEN) to make a useful statement. "Precise enough" is contextual. "Green" might be a perfectly precise enough referent if the namespace it's coming from (where we are referring to, and the application we are interested in) is dealing with "what colour is your car: green, red, blue, black, or white...?"; but not if it's intended to describe precisely a green colour to a garage to respray your car following an accident, when you would need to say e.g. "Ford Colour ref 3456/2009 Metallic Green".)

The underlying assumptions or axioms of the indecs approach are (1) Metadata is critical; (2) Stuff is complex; (3): Metadata is modular; and (4) Transactions need automation.

Use 

The indecs Framework does not presuppose any specific business model or legal framework; it can be used to describe transactions of copyrighted, open source, or freely available material.

The framework has been developed further as a generic ontology-based approach dealing with defined types of entity and attribute, and the relators that link them within a contextual model structure (where context is defined as an intersection of time and place, in which entities may play roles). Its main use to date has been in applications of commercial transactions of content and in some library-related applications. Examples of applications using this approach include:
 
 ISO/IEC 21000-6 (MPEG) Rights Data Dictionary (RDD)
 DDEX (Digital Data Exchange) Music industry messaging and data dictionary applications
 ONIX (Online Information Exchange) standards for the use of publishers in distributing digital metadata about their products
 DOI Digital Object Identifier System metadata schemes

One of the deliverables of the indecs project was a specification for a Directory of Parties. This led to a subsequent project, Interparty, funded under the European Commission's Information Society Technologies Programme, to design and specify a network to support interoperability of party identification (for both natural and corporate names) across different domains, building on the indecs principles. InterParty was not proposed as a replacement for existing schemes for the identification of participants in the intellectual property domain (e.g. national library name authority files or systems oriented towards the needs of rights licensing) but as a means of effecting their interoperation. Some of its conclusions have been used elsewhere, e.g. in the work on the proposed ISO ISNI (International Standard Name Identifier).

Other developments are continuing, notably through the OntologyX semantic engineering tools and services from Rightscom. The approach also has much in common with the CIDOC Conceptual Reference Model (CRM), an ontology for cultural heritage information, and the Functional Requirements for Bibliographic Records (FRBR) model in the library world.

In June 2009 a new initiative, the Vocabulary Mapping Framework (VMF), was announced by a consortium of partners. Funded by JISC, in Nov 2009 this delivered (as the first phase of an ongoing program of work) an extensive and authoritative mapping of vocabularies from nine major content metadata standards, creating a downloadable tool to support interoperability across communities. The mapping is also extensible to other standards. The work builds on the principles of interoperability established in the indecs Content Model, and is an expansion of the existing RDA/ONIX Framework for Resource Categorization into a comprehensive vocabulary of resource relators and categories, which will be a superset of those used in major standards from the publisher/producer, education and bibliographic/heritage communities. The International DOI Foundation, which fully endorses this work, is to provide a web hosting facility for the Framework as part of its commitment to promoting the wider use of interoperable metadata, and will use the vocabulary mapping wherever possible to support the association of metadata with DOI names

Intellectual property rights 

Indecs uses one common underlying structure which may be considered in three views: the general view; the commerce view; and the intellectual property (legal) view. An intellectual property right is a legal concept, with terms defined in a series of international conventions and treaties and under national law. The precise characteristics by which recognition of intellectual property rights is secured are elusive and are settled by editorial, commercial or, ultimately, by a legal judgement. Indecs does not attempt to replace such legal considerations, though a specific set of legal elements might be included in an indecs-based structure, and the indecs framework specifically includes some definitions from major international treaties such as the Berne Convention and the WIPO Copyright Treaty.

Mapping of terms 

Different models of the life cycle of content may have important differences, not least in the specific meaning attached to the names of terms they employ. FRBR, indecs and CRM were each informed by different functional requirements, and so evolved different mechanisms for dealing with the issues that seemed most important to them. Each is a particular view on the "universe of discourse" of resources and relationships: there are many valid views. Broadly, they are compatible, and effective integration of metadata from schemes based on them should be achievable, but they must be handled with care. As an example: the terms abstraction, manifestation, item and expression are often used in considering content life cycles (e.g. a sound recording is the expression of a musical work during a recording session at a particular place and time, and is distinct from, say, the master tape made, which is a manifestation). These were dealt with in indecs, but may have slightly different meanings in other schemes. Such an analysis of meaning of a term from a scheme is possible in indecs by mapping the precise definitions into further terms with precise definitions within the framework. indecs and other frameworks based on it continue to be developed and refined through the process of implementation.

References 

Intellectual property law
Metadata standards